Guðrún Kristín Magnúsdóttir (born 27 September 1939 in Reykjavík) is an Icelandic author and artist. She has received a number of awards as an artist and author of more than 130 books,
including children's books, books on nature, and the Óðsmál series.
The Icelandic Ministry of Education, Science, and Culture and Hagthenkir, the Association of Non-fiction and Educational Writers in Iceland, funded the Óðsmál series.

Guðrún received a research grant from the Icelandic Government Cultural Council in 1988. A model in her teens, she appeared in the Icelandic films Hrafninn flýgur (When the Raven Flies) 
and Myrkrahöfðinginn (Flames of Paradise).

Guðrún graduated from the Commercial College of Iceland in 1962, and graduated from the Icelandic Art Academy (Myndlista-og handíðaskóli Íslands) in 1973. She studied pedagogy at the University of Iceland, and was a distant-education student in the science of consciousness and physics at the Maharishi University of Management. Guðrún studied Sanskrit for several years.

A Heathen Gothi (goði) in Iceland, she grew up in Reykjavik and the Icelandic countryside, where many of her stories were written. Guðrún lives in Iceland, and has spent portions of her life in Scotland and Italy.

Work

Ceramics
Icelandic nature volcano souvenir (1984)

Scripts
Ég er hættur, farinn, ég er ekki með í svona asnalegu leikriti, staged at the Reykjavik City Theatre in 1990. The script won a competition for the theatre's opening piece.
Japl, jaml go fuður: a sitcom which was shortlisted in the MEDIA sub-programme of Creative Europe

Dramas
Halla, for the Icelandic National Broadcasting Service (RÚV) in 1982
Ég, hið silfraða sjal for RÚV (1983), and featured in the magazine Vikan in 1981
Í mjúku myrkri búa draumarnir, for RÚV (1988)

Illustrated children's stories
Stories for RÚV's Our Hour
Hannesar saga Grásteins, a book series published by the Icelandic National Center for Educational Materials in 1999

Guðrún received first and second prize from the Icelandic National Center for Educational Materials for short stories for teenagers in 1992.

Books 
 1000 stjörnur og fleira ljúft 
 Að leggja Bifröst lag fyrir lag 
 Apakríli, algjör dúlla! 
 Au pair 
 The Bairn of Trolls  
 Baldur Höður Loki: Lesum Óðsmál til að skilja 
 Baldur Höður Loki: What are we celebrating and why? Óðsmál gives intellectual understanding 
 Bína brúða 
 Búi skreytir jólatré 
 Consciousness and Mother Nature: What is Pure Consciousness and what is Mother Nature? 
 Dagdraumar og sorgarband 
 Draumahúsið 
 Drottinn blessi heimilið 
 Dívan skáldsins; -Góða nótt, sagði skáldið, og dó 
 Eru verkir með þessu? Fylgir þessu hiti, mamma?  
 Ég, hið silfraða sjal 
 Fluga 
 The Fly 
 Hagbarður og Hvutti 
 Hagbarður and Hvutti  
 Halla 
 Hnallur og Spói 
 The House of Dreams  
 How to Lay the Bridge Bifröst 
 Hreggnótt 
 Hrekkjusvín og ljósastaurar 
 Hrif 
 Huginn Jöruson, hornungur (sakamál) 
 Hvar voru hrossin í hríðinni? 
 Hver er hann þessi Jakob?  
 In Memoriam – skóflan  
 Í mjúku myrkri búa draumarnir 
 Japl, jaml og fuður 
 Jónki fór í réttirnar 
 Leyniþræðir 
 Melana, drottning frumskógarins 
 Mummi  
 My Bína Doll  
 Óðsmál 
 Óðsmál in fornu: efnisyfirlit vefútgáfu 
 Valhallar Óðsmál in gullnu: Handa þróuðum, vísindi, skilningur og djúp þekking forfeðra okkar enduruppgötvuð 
 Óðsmál 2012: Ævi hver til uppljómunar 
 Óðsmál – The Unseen Reality: Science of Consciousness in Heathenry 
 Óðsmál – Norse Edda Spiritual Highlights: We should know why we choose to be born  
 Palli og englabjallan 
 Rakni og Þögn ævintýri, KLUKK leikir barna 1900-2000  
 Saga Svaðilfara 
 Sál bróðurins, steinbítsbróðurins 
 Soul of a Brother 
 Sigga og hafragrauturinn 
 Skírnismál: helgileikar: handrit handa börnum / a script for bairns: ritual performance 
 Tíkin tóa og grey litli Krúsi 
 Tóta og þau  
 Tröllabarn  
 Vaknaðu, Lóa! Vaknaðu! 
 Vitund og móðir náttúra: Nemum upp ámáttkar fimbulrúnir 
 Who is Jakob?   
 Þetta er mitt hús 

The Hannesar saga Grásteins series:
Hannesar saga Grásteins, 1. bók: Branda skottlausa, amma Hannesar Grásteins 
Hannesar saga Grásteins, 2. bók: Branda Bröndudóttir og synir hennar: Hafri og Elri Gúlli 
Hannesar saga Grásteins, 3. bók: Hafri fer sér að voða, Elra Gúlla leiðist 
Hannesar saga Grásteins, 4. bók; Hannes Grásteinn og Surtarbrandur 
Hannesar saga Grásteins, 5. bók: Kettlingunum stolið 
Hannesar saga Grásteins, 6. bók: Það eina, sem er kátara en kátur kettlingur, er: kátir kettlingar 
Hannesar saga Grásteins, 7. bók: Hannes Grásteinn hverfur að heiman 
Hannesar saga Grásteins, 8. bók: Hannes Grásteinn villiköttur á skrifstofu í vesturbænum 
Hannesar saga Grásteins, 9. bók: Surtarbrandur fer sér að voða 
Hannesar saga Grásteins, 10. bók: Hannes veiðikló 
Hannesar saga Grásteins, 11. bók: Hefur kötturinn níu líf? 
Hannesar saga Grásteins, 12. bók: Hannes flytur í nýtt hverfi 
Hannesar saga Grásteins, 13. bók: Fleiri viðburðir: börn hvekkja Hannes; Hannes hvekkir stara 
Hannesar saga Grásteins, 14. bók: Milli 
Hannesar saga Grásteins, 15. bók: Snjótittlingaveiðar 
Hannesar saga Grásteins, 16. bók: Nýi kettlingurinn 
Hannesar saga Grásteins, 17. bók: Vor í lofti 
Hannesar saga Grásteins, 18. bók: Hannes fer í sveit 
Hannesar saga Grásteins, 19. bók: Hvolparnir 
Hannesar saga Grásteins, 20. bók: Dánartilkynning 

Krakka-Óðsmál in fornu, a 2011 40-book series (krakkar means "children" in Icelandic):
1 Þór 
2 Ægir og Rán 
3 Þríeindir 
4 Þjóðvitnir, Ullur, Heimdallur 
5 Tefla teitir á Iðavöllum unz koma þursamegir III 
6 Syn, Glasir, Valhöll, Einherjar 
7 Sif, Gefjun 
8 Freyr, Skírnir, Gerður 
9 Segðu mér, seiðskrati 
10 Uppeldi 
11 Rígur 
12 Jól, þorri, gói 
13 Helía, Mímir, valkyrja 
14 Svinnur, vín Valföðurs, Gungnir, Glaðheimar 
15 Óðinn, synir, hrafnar, eljur, Sleipnir, Valhöll 
16 Týr, Fenrir, Drómi, Læðingur, Gleipnir 
17 Sól og Nanna 
18 Frigg, Sága 
19 Fjörgyn, jörð, móðir, árstíðir, Svalinn, Mundilfari 
20 Gyðjan mikla, Freyja með Brísingamen 
21 Skaði, Njörður, Baldur 
22 Geri, Freki, jötnar 
23 Jólasveinar, álfar, gandreið 
24 Guðin, dagarnir, reikistjörnurnar, mannsheilinn 
25 Haftsænir, Gapþrosnir og fleira torskilið – ja bara óskiljanlegt 
26 Ginnungagap – höfuðskepnurnar 5 
27 Ginnungagap – nýsta ek niður 
28 Þund, heilög vötn hlóa 
29 Íslenska, samskrít 
30 Huginn, Muninn, Valhöll, einherjar 
31 Tært taugakerfi 
32 Tröll, jötnar, þursar, vættir, dvergar, þursameyjar, framþróun 
33 Urður, Verðandi, Skuld 
34 Yfir heiðina með vitkanum 
35 Hljóð og efni 
36 Hin árborna ámáttka, Grótti, þanþol, meiðmar 
37 Vitundarþroskamenntun handa öllum 
38 Að heyja frið, stjórnarskrá alheims 
39 Matur, melting, hegðan 
40 Ósvinnan horfin, Mímir endurheimtur 

Óðsmál for bairns, a 2014 40-book English translation of Krakka-Óðsmál in fornu (bairns is another word for "children"):
Óðsmál for bairns 1 Þór 
Óðsmál for bairns 2 Ægir and Rán  
Óðsmál for bairns 3 trinities  
Óðsmál for bairns 4 Þjóðvitnir, Ullur, Heimdallur  
Óðsmál for bairns 5 in Iðavellir - triguna 
Óðsmál for bairns 6 Syn, Glasir, Valhöll, einherjar  
Óðsmál for bairns 7 Sif, Easter  
Óðsmál for bairns 8 Freyr, Skírnir, Gerður - poem Skírnismál  
Óðsmál for bairns 9 tell me, wizard  
Óðsmál for bairns 10 upbringing 
Óðsmál for bairns 11 Rígur (on Edda-poem Rígsþula)  
Óðsmál for bairns 12 yule, þorri, gói  
Óðsmál for bairns 13 Hel, Mímir, valkyrja  
Óðsmál for bairns 14 svinnur, Valföðurs wine, Gungnir, Glaðheimar  
Óðsmál for bairns 15 Óðinn, sons, Sleipnir, Valhöll  
Óðsmál for bairns 16 Týr and Fenrir  
Óðsmál for bairns 17 Sól and Nanna  
Óðsmál for bairns 18 Frigg, Sága  
Óðsmál for bairns 19 Fjörgyn, Mother Earth  
Óðsmál for bairns 20 The Great Goddess 
Óðsmál for bairns 21 Skaði, Njörður, Baldur   
Óðsmál for bairns 22 jötnar, Geri, Freki  
Óðsmál for bairns 23 jólasveinar, elves, gandreið  
Óðsmál for bairns 24 Gods, days, planets, and more  
Óðsmál for bairns 25 Haftsænir, Gapþrosnir, Geirölnir, valkyrja  
Óðsmál for bairns 26 ginnungagap and the 5 elements  
Óðsmál for bairns 27 ginnungagap - nýsta ek niður  
Óðsmál for bairns 28 Þund  
Óðsmál for bairns 29 Sanskrit and Old Norse  
Óðsmál for bairns 30 Huginn, Muninn, Valhöll, einherjar  
Óðsmál for bairns 31 pure nervous system  
Óðsmál for bairns 32 tröll, jötnar, thurse-maidens, wights, dwarfs  
Óðsmál for bairns 33 Urður, Verðandi, Skuld  
Óðsmál for bairns 34 guided bird's eye view  
Óðsmál for bairns 35 sound and "matter"  
Óðsmál for bairns 36 mighty old Nature  
Óðsmál for bairns 37 consciousness-based education  
Óðsmál for bairns 38 waging peace 
Óðsmál for bairns 39 food, digestion, behaviour  
Óðsmál for bairns 40 ignorance gone, Mímir regained

References

External links 
 https://www.youtube.com/user/Goiagodi
 http://www.odsmal.org

1939 births
Adherents of Germanic neopaganism
Gudrun Kristin Magnusdottir
Gudrun Kristin Magnusdottir
Gudrun Kristin Magnusdottir
Living people
Modern pagan artists
Modern pagan religious leaders
Modern pagan writers
Gudrun Kristin Magnusdottir